I Feel Better may refer to:
 I Feel Better (film), a 2018 French comedy film
 "I Feel Better" (Gotye song), from the 2011 album Making Mirrors
 "I Feel Better" (Hot Chip song), from the 2010 album One Life Stand
 "I Feel Better", a song by John Entwistle from the 1972 album Whistle Rymes
 "I Feel Better", a song by Frightened Rabbit from the 2008 album The Midnight Organ Fight